The Central District of Ravar County is a district (bakhsh) in Ravar County, Kerman Province, Iran. At the 2006 census, its population was 31,140, in 8,278 families.  The district has one city: Ravar. The district has one rural district (dehestan): Ravar Rural District.

References 

Ravar County
Districts of Kerman Province